The Federal Correctional Institution, Allenwood Low (FCI Allenwood Low) is a low-security United States federal prison for male inmates in Gregg Township, Union County, Pennsylvania. It is part of the Allenwood Federal Correctional Complex (FCC Allenwood) and is operated by the Federal Bureau of Prisons, a division of the United States Department of Justice.

FCC Allenwood is located 75 miles north of Harrisburg, Pennsylvania, the state capital, just west of US Route 15.

Notable incidents
In February 2013, Fred Hagenbuch, 52, a former correction officer at the United States Penitentiary, Lewisburg, a high-security prison also located in Pennsylvania, pleaded guilty to a charge of theft of government property for stealing items from FCC Allenwood. The stolen property included electrical conduit, fence post, and mesh fencing valued at approximately $1,545.

Notable inmates (current and former)

See also
Federal Correctional Institution, Allenwood Medium
List of U.S. federal prisons
Federal Bureau of Prisons
Incarceration in the United States

References

Buildings and structures in Lycoming County, Pennsylvania
Allenwood Low
Allenwood Low